George Buckley may refer to:

Cricketers
George Buckley (cricketer, born 1875) (1875–1955), Olympic Games cricketer of 1900
George Buckley (cricketer, born 1889) (1889–1935), Derbyshire cricketer

Politicians
George Buckley (New Zealand politician) (1830–1895), 19th century member of the New Zealand Legislative Council
George Buckley (Australian politician) (1881–1958), member of the New South Wales Legislative Council
George Buckley (British politician) (1935–1991), British Labour Party Member of Parliament

Others
George Buckley (explorer) (1866–1937), Antarctic explorer
George W. Buckley (born 1947), president, chairman, and CEO of 3M
G. B. Buckley (George Bent Buckley, 1885–1962), English surgeon and cricket historian